Los Temerarios are a Mexican Grupera band from Fresnillo, Zacatecas started in 1978 by brothers Adolfo Angel and Gustavo Angel and their cousin Fernando Angel. During their early years, they were known as Conjunto La Brisa.

Los Temerarios have recorded more than 20 albums and been honored with multiple awards and nominations that include two Grammy nominations, one Latin Grammy Award, an Excellence Award from Premio Lo Nuestro and another Lifetime Achievement Award from the Latin Billboard Music Awards. In 2016, they were inducted into the Latin Songwriters Hall of Fame.

At the Inaugural Latin Grammy Awards of 2000, they received the award for best Mexican-American album.  In 2005, they received the Lifetime Achievement Award at the Premio Lo Nuestro 2005 Awards show.  The aforementioned award has only been given to the maximum exponents in Latin music history.  Similarly, in 2010, Los Temerarios received the Lifetime Achievement Award from 2010 Latin Billboard Music Awards held in Puerto Rico for their successful 30-year music career.   In 2012, Los Temerarios received their star on the famed Las Vegas Walk of Fame.

Discography
1981 – As Conjunto Las Brisas, they recorded two 45 format discs.
1983 – After changing their name to Los Temerarios, they release their first LP, Los 14 Grandes exitos De Los Temerarios.* 
1984 – Los Temerarios En La Altura
1985 – Cumbias Y Nortenas
1986 – Pero No
1987 – Fue Un Juego
1988 – Incontenibles
1989 – Internacionales y Romanticos
1990 – Te Quiero
1992 – Mi Vida Eres Tú 
1993 – Tu Ultima Cancion
1994 – En Concierto Vol. 1
1995 – Camino del Amor
1996 - Pequeña
1996 – Nuestras Canciones, Edicion de Oro, En Concierto Vol. 1 Fonovisa.
1996 – 15 Súper Éxitos Volumen 1
1997 – Nuestras Canciones Vol. 2, En Concierto Vol. 2
1998 – Como Te Recuerdo, 15 Exitos Para Siempre
2000 – En La Madrugada se Fue
2001 – Baladas Rancheras, Joyas, Vol. 1, Poemas Canciones y Romance
2002 – Una Lágrima No Basta, Joyas, Vol. 2, Poemas, Canciones y Romance, Vol. 2
2003 – Tributo al Amor
2004 – Veintisiete, Regalo de Amor
2005 – Sueño de Amor
2006 – Los Super Exitos Con Mariachi
2007 – Recuerdos del Alma
2008 – Si Tú Te Vas
2010 – Evolucion de Amor, Voz y Sentimiento: Sus Más Grandes Canciones de Amor
2012 – Mi Vida Sin Ti
2012 – 20 Kilates 
2012 – 30 Aniversario 
2012 – Iconos 25 Éxitos 
2013 – En Las Alturas 
2014 – Gran Encuentro 
2015 – Los Temerarios La Colección Completa
2016 – Solo Hits ( 20 Éxitos) 
2019 – Sin4onico
2020 – Los Temerarios Esencial

References

External links
Official website

Mexican musical groups
Latin Grammy Award winners
Musical groups established in 1978
Fonovisa Records artists
Regional Mexican musicians
Sibling musical duos